Burandt may refer to:

Burandt Lake, a lake in Minnesota

People with the surname
Corliss Orville Burandt, American engineer
Wolfgang Burandt, German jurist